Gustavo Alejandro Acevedo Nicolazzo (born 3 January 1997) is a Venezuelan medicine student, model and male beauty pageant titleholder. He was Mister Supranational Venezuela 2016 and represented Venezuela at the inaugural edition of Mister Supranational at Mister Supranational 2016 where he finished as one of the Top 10 finalists.

Life and career

Early life 
Acevedo was born in Caracas, Venezuela. He holds a degree in cardiovascular and respiratory therapy from the Central University of Venezuela. Acevedo is also a model, actor, boxer, Pan-American champion mixed martial artist and has served as a sports narrator on local television in his hometown.

Pageantry

Mister Venezuela 2016
In 2016, Gustavo participated in the 13th edition of the Mister Venezuela event held on May 28, 2016 at Venevisión studios in Caracas. The candidates were assigned numbers instead of state bands, with Acevedo being assigned #2. He ended as the 2nd runner-up. The winner was Renato Barabino, while the first runner-up was Walfred Crespo.

Later that year, he was appointed by the Miss Venezuela Organization as the first ever Mister Supranational Venezuela.

Mister Supranational 2016 
He represented Venezuela at the Mister Supranational 2016 pageant held on December 3, 2016 in Krynica-Zdrój, Poland. Acevedo ended in sixth place.

References

External links
 

Male beauty pageant winners
Living people
Venezuelan male models
1997 births
People from Caracas